10 Years is a 2011 American romantic comedy written and directed by Jamie Linden in his directorial debut. It stars an ensemble cast including Channing Tatum, Jenna Dewan, Justin Long, Kate Mara, Rosario Dawson, Oscar Isaac, Lynn Collins, Chris Pratt, Scott Porter, Brian Geraghty, Aubrey Plaza, and Anthony Mackie. It was released September 14, 2012, in select theaters.

Plot
On the day of their 10-year high school reunion, Jake and his girlfriend Jess arrive at the home of his now-married high school friends Cully and Sam. Other friends begin to arrive including best friends Marty and AJ, famous musician Reeves, and the adventurous Scott with his wife, Suki. They depart for the reunion and reunite with their friend Garrity and meet his wife Olivia; and reconnect with Garrity's best friend Andre. Meanwhile, reclusive classmate Elise arrives at the reunion alone. She is ignored by the party planner, prom queen Anna.

Jake, Cully, Andre, and Reeves smoke a joint in Jake's car when he reveals an envelope with an engagement ring inside, stating that he has intended to ask Jess to marry him for quite some time but hasn't found the right moment to propose. However, Jake is conflicted when he sees his high school sweetheart Mary and her new husband Paul. Jake, Jess, Mary, and Paul share awkward introductions, and Jake and Mary reconnect for the first time in eight years. Reeves approaches Elise and the pair reminisce when he spots an old picture of Elise wearing bright yellow shoes.

As the night continues, Olivia unexpectedly discovers that Garrity has an affinity for hip hop, Cully drunkenly attempts and fails to appropriately apologize to some geeky classmates for being a bully in high school, and Marty and AJ attempt to flirt with Anna, causing tension between the duo. Jake and Mary discuss prom, which they were unable to attend due to Mary's father having a heart attack that night. As the reunion comes to a close, the group departs for a local karaoke bar. Reeves flirts with Elise but she turns him down.

Anna leaves the party early, resulting in Marty and AJ deciding to toilet paper her house. At the bar, Jess takes notice of Jake's behavior around Mary and decides to return to the hotel under the guise of being tired. Paul does the same. Scott and Suki sing karaoke and Olivia is impressed by Garrity's breakdancing abilities. Reeves is pressured by his friends to sing his hit song "Never Had". Elise, never having heard the song, realizes it was inspired by her. The two share a kiss and spend the remainder of the night together. Anna catches Marty and AJ vandalizing her home and becomes upset, revealing that she is now an unhappy single mother with two children. Marty reveals that he is not a successful New Yorker, but instead lives in a small apartment and is financially unstable, and AJ reveals that he is getting a divorce. The trio bond over their shared life issues.

As the night comes to a close, Cully becomes embarrassingly drunk and upsets Sam. Scott reveals to his friends that he intends on returning to Japan with Suki to continue their adventures together. Mary asks Jake for the dance they never had at prom, finally giving them an opportunity to properly end their relationship. Mary reveals that she's pregnant, the two agree that they are happy with where their lives have taken them. Jake returns to the hotel and finds Jess still awake. She reveals that she left to allow Jake to get his closure with Mary.

Jake and Jess soon join their friends at a local diner. Jake returns to his car and obtains the engagement ring from the envelope.

Cast

Production
A short film titled Ten Year was produced in 2011 by Channing Tatum to attract financing for the feature film.

The film was produced by Marty Bowen, Reid Carolin, Wyck Godfrey and Channing Tatum, and the screenplay was written by Jamie Linden. The film was shot in New York, California and New Mexico starting in January 2011.

Release 
The film had a red carpet premiere at the Toronto International Film Festival.

Reception
The site's critics consensus reads: "A sweet ensemble comedy about a high school reunion, 10 Years is well cast but unfortunately predictable and short on three-dimensional characters." On Metacritic the film has a score of 61 out of 100 based on reviews from 18 critics, indicating "generally favorable reviews".

Gary Goldstein of the Los Angeles Times called it "largely engaging" but that "there’s a lot of been-there, done-that going on." 
David Rooney of The Hollywood Reporter says the film "pulls us in eventually, delivering its share of poignant insights and melancholy reflections, even if it does all feel a tad familiar."

References

External links 
 

 10 Years at fthismovie.net

2011 films
2010s English-language films
2011 romantic comedy-drama films
Class reunions in popular culture
Films shot in New York (state)
Films shot in New Mexico
Films shot in California
Temple Hill Entertainment films
American romantic comedy-drama films
Films scored by Chad Fischer
2011 directorial debut films
2011 independent films
Films produced by Wyck Godfrey
2010s American films